Guy Trédaniel is a French publisher who founded in 1974 Editions Guy Trédaniel, a printing company based in Paris, France.

Best-seller authors

 Michel Saloff Coste
 Jean-Pierre Willem
 Michel Gauquelin
 Pierre Plantard

See also
 Rite of Adoption
 Priory of Sion
 Mind and Life Institute
 The Templar Revelation

External links

Official website

Living people
Year of birth missing (living people)
French publishers (people)